Haughton High School is a public high school in Haughton, Louisiana, United States that enrolls 1,159 students from grades 9–12. The school received an "A" rating by the Louisiana Department of Education. It is administered by Bossier Parish Schools. 80% of students received a four-year diploma, compared to 79% in the district and 74% statewide. The Haughton Buccaneers play in district District 1-5A.

Athletics
Haughton High athletics competes in the LHSAA.

Championships
Football Championships
(1) State Championship: 1977

Notable alumni
 Myron Baker, linebacker for the Bears and Panthers.
 Joe Delaney (class of 1977) former NFL running back.
 Crystal Smith (class of 2002), WNBA player.
 Dak Prescott (class of 2011), quarterback for the Mississippi State Bulldogs football team. Quarterback for the Dallas Cowboys in the NFL.

Notable faculty
 Billy Wayne Montgomery, tennis coach, basketball coach, principal and a former member of the Louisiana House of Representatives.

References

External links
 School website
 http://haughtonh.bossierschools.org/

Public high schools in Louisiana
Schools in Bossier Parish, Louisiana